Osełków  is a village in the administrative district of Gmina Łączna, within Skarżysko County, Świętokrzyskie Voivodeship, in south-central Poland.

References

Villages in Skarżysko County